Deulgaon, commonly known as Deulgaon Gujari, is a village located in Jamner taluka of Jalgaon district, in state of Maharashtra.

Demographics
As per 2011 census:
Deulgaon Gujari has 913 families residing. The village has population of 4121.
Out of the population of 4121, 2110 are males while 2011 are females.
Literacy rate of the village is 68.32%.
Average sex ratio of the village is 953 females to 1000 males. Average sex ratio of Maharashtra state is 929.

Geography, and transport

References

Villages in Jalgaon district